Jusepa Vaca (1589-1653) was a Spanish stage actress, known as "la Gallarda". She belonged to the more famous and popular of her era, celebrated by artists such as Lope de Vega and Luis Vélez de Guevara as one of the most famed actresses in Spain of her time.

References
 García Lorenzo, Luciano (1 de julio de 2013). «El mundo del teatro español en la época áurea (4). Josefa Vaca». Rinconete (Centro Virtual Cervantes). Consultado el febrero de 2015.

1589 births
1653 deaths
17th-century Spanish actresses